Mortal coil is a quotation from Shakespeare's Hamlet.

Mortal coil may also refer to:

Literature
 Mortal Coils, a 1922 collection of short stories by Aldous Huxley
 Skulduggery Pleasant: Mortal Coil, the fifth book in the Skulduggery Pleasant series
 This Mortal Coil (book), a 1947 collection of short stories by Cynthia Asquith

Music
 "Mortal Coil", a song by God Is an Astronaut from the album Epitaph
 This Mortal Coil (Redemption album), 2011
 "This Mortal Coil", a song by Carcass
 This Mortal Coil, a British dream pop band

Television
 "Mortal Coil" (Star Trek: Voyager), a 1997 episode from the TV series Star Trek: Voyager
 "This Mortal Coil" (Stargate Atlantis), a 2007 episode from the TV series Stargate Atlantis

Other uses
 Mortal Coil: Adrenalin Intelligence, a 1995 computer video game
 "The Mortal Coil", a 1992 two-part episode from the radio show Adventures in Odyssey

See also
Immortal Coil, a 2002 Star Trek: The Next Generation novel by Jeffrey Lang
Coil (disambiguation)